Vernon R. Laning (born December 31, 1948) is an American politician. He has served as a Republican member for the 8th district in the North Dakota House of Representatives since 2013.

In 2017, while defending North Dakota's Blue Laws, Laning argued that under the system, his wallet gets "a half day off" from his wife's spending.

References

1948 births
People from LaMoure County, North Dakota
North Dakota State University alumni
Living people
Republican Party members of the North Dakota House of Representatives
21st-century American politicians